Fernand-E. Leblanc (1 July 1917 – 8 January 1996) was a Liberal party member of the House of Commons of Canada and then the Senate of Canada. He was born in Montreal, Quebec and became a chartered accountant by career. He was also a councillor for the municipality of Saint-Hippolyte, Quebec prior to entering federal politics.

He was first elected at the Laurier riding in
a 10 February 1964 by-election, serving in the latter portion of the 26th Canadian Parliament. Leblanc was re-elected to consecutive terms at Laurier until 1979 when he was appointed to the Senate for the Saurel, Quebec division. Leblanc remained a senator until 1 July 1992.

Leblanc's funeral was held in Montreal on 12 January 1996.

References

External links
 

1917 births
1996 deaths
Canadian accountants
Canadian senators from Quebec
Liberal Party of Canada MPs
Liberal Party of Canada senators
Members of the House of Commons of Canada from Quebec
Politicians from Montreal
Quebec municipal councillors